Reaching Out is a song by UK electronic trio Nero from their debut album Welcome Reality. It was released as the sixth single from the album on 16 December 2011, peaking at number 92 on the UK Singles Chart and number nine on the UK Dance Chart.

Creation
Drafted out by Daniel Stephens, he had an original vision in his mind of sampling Daryl Hall's voice. The office next door to Nero's was occupied by the producer for Hall's latest solo album, Laughing Down Crying, who agreed to put the pair in touch. Hall hence agreed to lay down a full original set of vocals, recorded by Nero.

The track samples an arpeggio from 80's Italian dance group Kano's "Another Life", and features guest vocals from Daryl Hall from Hall & Oates. The song also heavily samples the duo's 80's hit "Out of Touch".

Music video
A music video to accompany the release of "Reaching Out" was uploaded to YouTube on 25 November 2011 at a total length of 2 minutes and 57 seconds.

The video heavily references the opening sequences for 80's TV series, such as Miami Vice and Kojak by using original stock footage to build a TV title sequence narrative, suggestively set in Miami or a similar beach-city. The creators also add ludicrous typography and clunky, over-the-top transitions to match. The video also stars all  members of Nero (including Alana Watson), as well as a guest appearance by Hall.

Track listing

Personnel
Lead vocals – Daryl Hall
Producers – Nero
Lyrics – Daniel Stephens, Joseph Ray, Alana Watson, Daryl Hall
Label: MTA, Mercury

Chart performance

References

Nero (band) songs
2011 singles
MTA Records singles
2011 songs
Songs written by Daryl Hall